In mathematics, the Kallman–Rota inequality, introduced by , is a generalization of the Landau–Kolmogorov inequality to Banach spaces.  It states that 
if A is the infinitesimal generator of a one-parameter contraction semigroup then

References
.

Inequalities